"Baby, I Love You" is a song originally recorded by the Ronettes in 1963 and released on their debut album Presenting the Fabulous Ronettes (1964). The song was written by Jeff Barry, Ellie Greenwich, and Phil Spector, and produced by Spector.

Released in November 1963, the single reached number 24 on both the US Billboard Hot 100 and Cashbox Top 100 charts, and peaked at number 11 on the UK Singles Chart. Billboard ranked the song as number 56 on their list of 100 Greatest Girl Group Songs of All Time.

Original recording
After their lack of success under contract to Colpix Records between 1961 and 1963, the Ronettes ended their Colpix contract and signed with Phil Spector's Philles Records in early 1963. During their first few months with Phil Spector, the Ronettes achieved mainstream success with the release of "Be My Baby" in August 1963, which climbed to number two on the US Billboard Hot 100 and peaked at number one on the Cashbox Hot 100. It was the success of "Be My Baby" which had Spector eager to do a follow-up for the Ronettes in the fall of 1963.

However, a problem arose when the Ronettes were booked to appear on Dick Clark's "Caravan of Stars" tour across the country. Phil Spector decided to keep lead singer Ronnie Bennett in California to record "Baby, I Love You" while the other two Ronettes, Estelle Bennett and Nedra Talley, went out on the tour with Dick Clark. Ronnie's cousin, Elaine, took her place on the tour while Ronnie recorded the song at Gold Star Studios in Los Angeles. Since the other Ronettes were unavailable for recording, Spector used Sonny Bono, Darlene Love, and Cher to complete the backing vocals. The song also featured Leon Russell on piano. "Baby, I Love You" peaked at number 11 in the UK during January 1964, at a time when the Ronettes were touring the UK as the support act to the Rolling Stones.

Billboard described the song as a "swinging, glandular side that should soar," stating it has the "big Philadelphia
sound."  Cash Box described it as a "big-sounding mashed potatoes stomp’er that the gals and their instrumental support deliver in ultra-commercial manner," also calling it a "sensational new entry." The song was featured on the album Presenting the Fabulous Ronettes, which was released at the end of 1964.

Personnel
Lead vocals by Ronnie Bennett
Background vocals by Cher, Sonny Bono, and the Blossoms (Darlene Love, Fanita James, and Gracia Nitzsche)
Instrumentation by the Wrecking Crew

Chart history

Andy Kim version

Andy Kim recorded the song for Jeff Barry's record label Steed Records on his album Baby I Love You (1969). Kim's version became a US Top Ten hit, reaching number nine in 1969 and earned a gold record.

Chart history

Weekly charts

Year-end charts

Ramones version

Phil Spector produced the Ramones' cover version of the song which appeared on their album, End of the Century (1980). The single reached number eight in the UK Singles Chart in 1980, their biggest UK top-ten hit.

Background and reception 
In an incident at Spector's house, the producer held the Ramones hostage at gunpoint and made them listen to him play "Baby, I Love You" until 4:30 in the morning. Spector insisted that the Ramones recorded a cover of the song and got Joey Ramone to sing it with some session musicians, as none of the other members of the Ramones would play on it. Joey has said that "it didn't sound anything like the Ramones" and he hated the song. Mickey Leigh (Joey's brother) has said "it made me almost embarrassed", "with its gooey string section arrangement that sounded right out of Redbone's "Come and Get Your Love"".

Kurt Loder for the Rolling Stone described it as a "sludged-out rehash of the Ronettes antiquity" that was "a bad idea to begin with, and one that’s further burdened by the cheesiest string arrangement this side of the Longines Symphonette". Reviewing End of the Century retrospectively for Pitchfork, Evan Minsker wrote that "even with a full understanding of End of the Century’s context, “Baby, I Love You” is jarring" and "is a museum piece—a pound-for-pound attempt to relive Spector’s golden years".

Charts

References

1963 songs
1963 singles
1969 singles
1972 singles
1980 singles
Songs written by Phil Spector
Songs written by Jeff Barry
Songs written by Ellie Greenwich
The Ronettes songs
Dave Edmunds songs
Andy Kim songs
Ramones songs
Song recordings produced by Phil Spector
Song recordings with Wall of Sound arrangements
RPM Top Singles number-one singles
Philles Records singles
Sire Records singles
Rock ballads
Pop ballads